Water skiing competitions at the 2022 Bolivarian Games in Valledupar, Colombia were held from 2 to 4 July 2022 at Club Los Lagartos in Bogotá, a sub-venue outside Valledupar.

Eight medal events were scheduled to be contested in four disciplines; jump, tricks, slalom and overall for each men and women. A total of 18 athletes (10 men and 8 women) competed in the events. The water skiers who participated in the events had to be at least 12 years old.

It was planned that a wakeboard event for both men and women would be held, but finally did not take place.

Colombia were the water skiing competitions defending champions after having won them in the previous edition in Santa Marta 2017. Chile obtained 5 of the 8 gold medals at stake to win the water skiing competitions.

Participating nations
A total of 4 nations (3 ODEBO nations and 1 invited) registered athletes for the water skiing competitions. Each nation was able to enter a maximum of 12 water skiers (6 per gender).

Venue
The water skiing competitions were held at Club Los Lagartos in Bogotá.

Medal summary

Medal table

Medalists

Men's events

Women's events

References

External links
Bolivarianos Valledupar 2022 Water skiing

2022 in water skiing
2022 Bolivarian Games